This is a timeline of the history of medicine and medical technology.

Antiquity 
 3300 BC – During the Stone Age, early doctors used very primitive forms of herbal medicine in Europe.
 3000 BC – Ayurveda The origins of Ayurveda have been traced back to around 3,000 BCE.
 c. 2600 BC – Imhotep the priest-physician who was later deified as the Egyptian god of medicine.
 2500 BC – Iry Egyptian inscription speaks of Iry as eye-doctor of the palace, palace physician of the belly, guardian of the royal bowels, and he who prepares the important medicine (name cannot be translated) and knows the inner juices of the body.
 1900–1600 BC Akkadian clay tablets on medicine survive primarily as copies from Ashurbanipal's library at Nineveh.
 1800 BC – Code of Hammurabi sets out fees for surgeons and punishments for malpractice
 1800 BC – Kahun Gynecological Papyrus
 1600 BC – Hearst papyrus, coprotherapy and magic
 1551 BC – Ebers Papyrus, coprotherapy and magic
 1500 BC – Saffron used as a medicine on the Aegean island of Thera in ancient Greece
 1500 BC – Edwin Smith Papyrus, an Egyptian medical text and the oldest known surgical treatise (no true surgery) no magic
 1300 BC – Brugsch Papyrus and London Medical Papyrus
 1250 BC – Asklepios
 9th century – Hesiod reports an ontological conception of disease via the Pandora myth. Disease has a "life" of its own but is of divine origin.
 8th century – Homer tells that Polydamna supplied the Greek forces besieging Troy with healing drugs. Homer also tells about battlefield surgery Idomeneus tells Nestor after Machaon had fallen: A surgeon who can cut out an arrow and heal the wound with his ointments is worth a regiment.
 700 BC – Cnidos medical school; also one at Cos
 500 BC – Darius I orders the restoration of the House of Life (First record of a (much older) medical school)
 500 BC – Bian Que becomes the earliest physician known to use acupuncture and pulse diagnosis
 500 BC – The Sushruta Samhita is published, laying the framework for Ayurvedic medicine
  –  – Empedocles four elements
 500 BC – Pills were used. They were presumably invented so that measured amounts of a medicinal substance could be delivered to a patient.
 510–430 BC – Alcmaeon of Croton scientific anatomic dissections. He studied the optic nerves and the brain, arguing that the brain was the seat of the senses and intelligence. He distinguished veins from the arteries and had at least vague understanding of the circulation of the blood. Variously described by modern scholars as Father of Anatomy; Father of Physiology; Father of Embryology; Father of Psychology; Creator of Psychiatry; Founder of Gynecology; and as the Father of Medicine itself. There is little evidence to support the claims but he is, nonetheless, important.
 fl. 425 BC – Diogenes of Apollonia
 c. 484 – 425 BC – Herodotus tells us Egyptian doctors were specialists: Medicine is practiced among them on a plan of separation; each physician treats a single disorder, and no more. Thus the country swarms with medical practitioners, some undertaking to cure diseases of the eye, others of the head, others again of the teeth, others of the intestines, and some those which are not local.
 496 – 405 BC – Sophocles "It is not a learned physician who sings incantations over pains which should be cured by cutting."
 420 BC – Hippocrates of Cos maintains that diseases have natural causes and puts forth the Hippocratic Oath. Origin of rational medicine.

Medicine after Hippocrates
 c. 400 BC – 1 BC – The Huangdi Neijing (Yellow Emperor's Classic of Internal Medicine) is published, laying the framework for traditional Chinese medicine
 4th century BC – Philistion of Locri Praxagoras distinguishes veins and arteries and determines only arteries pulse
 375–295 BC – Diocles of Carystus
 354 BC – Critobulus of Cos extracts an arrow from the eye of Phillip II, treating the loss of the eyeball without causing facial disfigurement.
 3rd century BC – Philinus of Cos founder of the Empiricist school. Herophilos and Erasistratus practice androtomy. (Dissecting live and dead human beings)
 280 BC – Herophilus Dissection studies the nervous system and distinguishes between sensory nerves and motor nerves and the brain. also the anatomy of the eye and medical terminology such as (in Latin translation "net like" becomes retiform/retina.
 270 – Huangfu Mi writes the Zhenjiu Jiayijing (The ABC Compendium of Acupuncture), the first textbook focusing solely on acupuncture
 250 BC – Erasistratus studies the brain and distinguishes between the cerebrum and cerebellum physiology of the brain, heart and eyes, and in the vascular, nervous, respiratory and reproductive systems.
 219 – Zhang Zhongjing publishes Shang Han Lun (On Cold Disease Damage).
 200 BC – the Charaka Samhita uses a rational approach to the causes and cure of disease and uses objective methods of clinical examination
 124 – 44 BC – Asclepiades of Bithynia
 116 – 27 BC – Marcus Terentius Varro Prototypal germ theory of disease.
 1st century AD – Rufus of Ephesus; Marcellinus a physician of the first century AD; Numisianus
 23 – 79 AD – Pliny the Elder writes Natural History
  –  – Aulus Cornelius Celsus Medical encyclopedia
 50 – 70 AD – Pedanius Dioscorides writes De Materia Medica – a precursor of modern pharmacopoeias that was in use for almost 1600 years
 2nd century AD Aretaeus of Cappadocia
 98 – 138 AD – Soranus of Ephesus
 129 – 216 AD – Galen – Clinical medicine based on observation and experience. The resulting tightly integrated and comprehensive system, offering a complete medical philosophy dominated medicine throughout the Middle Ages and until the beginning of the modern era.

After Galen 200 AD 

 d. 260 – Gargilius Martialis, short Latin handbook on Medicines from Vegetables and Fruits
 4th century Magnus of Nisibis, Alexandrian doctor and professor book on urine
 325 – 400 – Oribasius 70 volume encyclopedia
 362 – Julian orders xenones built, imitating Christian charity (proto hospitals)
 369 – Basil of Caesarea founded at Caesarea in Cappadocia an institution (hospital) called Basilias, with several buildings for patients, nurses, physicians, workshops, and schools
 375 – Ephrem the Syrian opened a hospital at Edessa They spread out and specialized nosocomia for the sick, brephotrophia for foundlings, orphanotrophia for orphans, ptochia for the poor, xenodochia for poor or infirm pilgrims, and gerontochia for the old.
 400 – The first hospital in Latin Christendom was founded by Fabiola at Rome
 420 – Caelius Aurelianus a doctor from Sicca Veneria (El-Kef, Tunisia) handbook On Acute and Chronic Diseases in Latin.
 447 – Cassius Felix of Cirta (Constantine, Ksantina, Algeria), medical handbook drew on Greek sources, Methodist and Galenist in Latin
 480 – 547 Benedict of Nursia founder of "monastic medicine"
 484 – 590 – Flavius Magnus Aurelius Cassiodorus
 fl. 511 – 534 – Anthimus Greek: Ἄνθιμος
 536 – Sergius of Reshaina (died 536) – A Christian theologian-physician who translated thirty-two of Galen's works into Syriac and wrote medical treatises of his own
 525 – 605 – Alexander of Tralles Alexander Trallianus
 500 – 550 – Aetius of Amida Encyclopedia 4 books each divided into 4 sections
 second half of 6th century building of xenodocheions/bimārestāns by the Nestorians under the Sasanians, would evolve into the complex secular "Islamic hospital", which combined lay practice and Galenic teaching
  550 – 630 Stephanus of Athens
 560 – 636 – Isidore of Seville
 c. 620 Aaron of Alexandria  Syriac . He wrote 30 books on medicine, the "Pandects". He was the first author in antiquity who mentioned the diseases of smallpox and measles translated by Māsarjawaih a Syrian Jew and Physician, into Arabic about A. D. 683
 c. 630 – Paul of Aegina Encyclopedia in 7 books very detailed surgery used by Albucasis
 790 – 869 – Leo Itrosophist also Mathematician or Philosopher wrote "Epitome of Medicine"
 c. 800 – 873 – Al-Kindi (Alkindus) De Gradibus
 820 – Benedictine hospital founded, School of Salerno would grow around it
 d. 857 – Mesue the elder (Yūḥannā ibn Māsawayh) Syriac Christian
 c. 830 – 870 – Hunayn ibn Ishaq (Johannitius) Syriac-speaking Christian also knew Greek and Arabic. Translator and author of several medical tracts.
 c. 838 – 870 – Ali ibn Sahl Rabban al-Tabari, writes an encyclopedia of medicine in Arabic.
 c. 910d – Ishaq ibn Hunayn
 9th century – Yahya ibn Sarafyun  a Syriac physician Johannes Serapion, Serapion the Elder
 c. 865 – 925 – Rhazes pediatrics, and makes the first clear distinction between smallpox and measles in his al-Hawi.
 d. 955 – Isaac Judaeus Isḥāq ibn Sulaymān al-Isrāʾīlī Egyptian born Jewish physician
 913 – 982 – Shabbethai Donnolo alleged founding father of School of Salerno wrote in Hebrew
 d. 982 – 994 – 'Ali ibn al-'Abbas al-Majusi  Haly Abbas
 1000 – Albucasis (936–1018) surgery Kitab al-Tasrif, surgical instruments.   
 d. 1075 – Ibn Butlan Christian physician of Baghdad Tacuinum sanitatis the Arabic original and most of the Latin copies, are in tabular format
 1018 – 1087 – Michael Psellos or Psellus a Byzantine monk, writer, philosopher, politician and historian. several books on medicine
 c. 1030 – Avicenna The Canon of Medicine The Canon remains a standard textbook in Muslim and European universities until the 18th century.
 c. 1071 – 1078 – Simeon Seth or Symeon Seth an 11th-century Jewish Byzantine translated Arabic works into Greek
 1084 – First documented hospital in England Canterbury
 d. 1087 – Constantine the African
 1083 – 1153 – Anna Komnene, Latinized as Comnena
 1095 – Congregation of the Antonines, was founded to treat victims of "St. Anthony's fire" a skin disease.
 Late 11th or early 12th century – Trotula
 1123 – St Bartholomew's Hospital founded by the court jester Rahere Augustine nuns originally cared for the patients. Mental patients were accepted along with others
 1127 – Stephen of Antioch translated the work of Haly Abbas
 1100 – 1161 – Avenzoar Teacher of Averroes
 1170 – Rogerius Salernitanus composed his Chirurgia also known as The Surgery of Roger
 1126 – 1198 – Averroes
 d. c. 1161 – Matthaeus Platearius

1200–1499
 1203 – Innocent III organized the hospital of Santo Spirito at Rome inspiring others all over Europe
  c. 1210 – 1277 – William of Saliceto, also known as Guilielmus de Saliceto
 1210 – 1295 – Taddeo Alderotti – Scholastic medicine
 1240 Bartholomeus Anglicus
 1242 – Ibn an-Nafis suggests that the right and left ventricles of the heart are separate and discovers the pulmonary circulation and coronary circulation
 c. 1248 – Ibn al-Baitar wrote on botany and pharmacy, studied animal anatomy and medicine veterinary medicine.
 1249 – Roger Bacon writes about convex lens spectacles for treating long-sightedness
 1257 – 1316 Pietro d'Abano also known as Petrus De Apono or Aponensis
 1260 – Louis IX established Les Quinze-vingt; originally a retreat for the blind, it became a hospital for eye diseases, and is now one of the most important medical centers in Paris
 c. 1260 – 1320 Henri de Mondeville
 1284 – Mansur hospital of Cairo
 –  Joannes Zacharias Actuarius a Byzantine physician wrote the last great compendium of Byzantine medicine
1275 –1326 – Mondino de Luzzi  "Mundinus" carried out the first systematic human dissections since Herophilus of Chalcedon and Erasistratus of Ceos 1500 years earlier. 
 1288 – The hospital of Santa Maria Nuova founded in Florence, it was strictly medical.
 1300 – concave lens spectacles to treat myopia developed in Italy.
 1310 – Pietro d'Abano's Conciliator
 d. 1348 – Gentile da Foligno
 1292–1350 – Ibn Qayyim al-Jawziya
  1306–1390 – John of Arderne
 d. 1368 – Guy de Chauliac
  f. 1460 – Heinrich von Pfolspeundt
 1443 – 1502 – Antonio Benivieni Pathological anatomy
 1493 – 1541 – Paracelsus On the relationship between medicine and surgery surgery book

1500–1799 

 Early 16th century:
 Paracelsus, an alchemist by trade, rejects occultism and pioneers the use of chemicals and minerals in medicine. Burns the books of Avicenna, Galen and Hippocrates.
 Hieronymus Fabricius His "Surgery" is mostly that of Celsus, Paul of Aegina, and Abulcasis citing them by name.
 Caspar Stromayr
 1500? – 1561 Pierre Franco
 Ambroise Paré (1510–1590) pioneered the treatment of gunshot wounds.
 Bartholomeo Maggi at Bologna, Felix Wurtz of Zurich, Léonard Botal in Paris, and the Englishman Thomas Gale (surgeon), (the diversity of their geographical origins attests to the widespread interest of surgeons in the problem), all published works urging similar treatment to Paré's. But it was Paré's writings which were the most influential.
 1518 – College of Physicians founded now known as Royal College of Physicians of London is a British professional body of doctors of general medicine and its subspecialties. It received the royal charter in 1518
 1510 – 1590 – Ambroise Paré surgeon
 1540 – 1604 – William Clowes – Surgical chest for military surgeons
 1543 – Andreas Vesalius publishes De Fabrica Corporis Humani which corrects Greek medical errors and revolutionizes European medicine
 1546 – Girolamo Fracastoro proposes that epidemic diseases are caused by transferable seedlike entities
 1550 – 1612 – Peter Lowe
 1553 – Miguel Servet describes the circulation of blood through the lungs. He is accused of heresy and burned at the stake
 1556 – Amato Lusitano describes venous valves in the Ázigos vein
 1559 – Realdo Colombo describes the circulation of blood through the lungs in detail
 1563 – Garcia de Orta founds tropical medicine with his treatise on Indian diseases and treatments
 1570 – 1643 – John Woodall Ship surgeons used lemon juice to treat scurvy wrote  "The Surgions Mate"
 1590 – Microscope was invented, which played a huge part in medical advancement
 1596 – Li Shizhen publishes Běncǎo Gāngmù or Compendium of Materia Medica
 1603 – Girolamo Fabrici studies leg veins and notices that they have valves which allow blood to flow only toward the heart
 1621 – 1676 – Richard Wiseman
 1628 – William Harvey explains the circulatory system in Exercitatio Anatomica de Motu Cordis et Sanguinis in Animalibus
 1683 – 1758 – Lorenz Heister
 1688 – 1752 – William Cheselden
 1701 – Giacomo Pylarini gives the first smallpox inoculations in Europe. They were widely practised in the East before then.
 1714 – 1789 – Percivall Pott
 1720 – Lady Mary Wortley Montagu
 1728 – 1793 – John Hunter
 1736 – Claudius Aymand performs the first successful appendectomy
 1744 – 1795 – Pierre-Joseph Desault First surgical periodical
 1747 – James Lind discovers that citrus fruits prevent scurvy
 1749 – 1806 – Benjamin Bell – Leading surgeon of his time and father of a surgical dynasty, author of "A System of Surgery"
 1752 – 1832 – Antonio Scarpa
 1763 – 1820 – John Bell
  1766 – 1842 – Dominique Jean Larrey Surgeon to Napoleon
 1768 – 1843 – Astley Cooper surgeon lectures principles and practice
 1774 – 1842 – Charles Bell, surgeon
 1774 – Joseph Priestley discovers nitrous oxide, nitric oxide, ammonia, hydrogen chloride and oxygen
 1777 – 1835 – Baron Guillaume Dupuytren – Head surgeon at Hôtel-Dieu de Paris, The age Dupuytren
 1785 – William Withering publishes "An Account of the Foxglove" the first systematic description of digitalis in treating dropsy
 1790 – Samuel Hahnemann rages against the prevalent practice of bloodletting as a universal cure and founds homeopathy
 1796 – Edward Jenner develops a smallpox vaccination method
 1799 – Humphry Davy discovers the anesthetic properties of nitrous oxide

1800–1899 
 1800 – Humphry Davy announces the anaesthetic properties of nitrous oxide.
 1803 – 1841 – Morphine was first isolated by Friedrich Sertürner, this is generally believed to be the first isolation of an active ingredient from a plant.
 1813–1883 – James Marion Sims vesico-vaganial surgery Father of surgical gynecology.
 1816 – René Laennec invents the stethoscope.
 1827 – 1912 – Joseph Lister antiseptic surgery Father of modern surgery
 1818 – James Blundell performs the first successful human  transfusion.
 1842 – Crawford Long performs the first surgical operation using anesthesia with ether.
 1845 – John Hughes Bennett first describes leukemia as a blood disorder.
 1846 – First painless surgery with general anesthetic.
 1847 – Ignaz Semmelweis discovers how to prevent puerperal fever.
 1849 – Elizabeth Blackwell is the first woman to gain a medical degree in the United States.
 1850 – Female Medical College of Pennsylvania (later Woman's Medical College), the first medical college in the world to grant degrees to women, is founded in Philadelphia.
 1858 – Rudolf Carl Virchow 13 October 1821 – 5 September 1902  his theories of cellular pathology spelled the end of Humoral medicine.
 1861 – Louis Pasteur discovers the Germ Theory
 1867 – Lister publishes Antiseptic Principle of the Practice of Surgery, based partly on Pasteur's work.
 1870 – Louis Pasteur and Robert Koch establish the germ theory of disease.
 1878 – Ellis Reynolds Shipp graduates from the Women's Medical College of Pennsylvania and begins practice in Utah.
 1879 – First vaccine for cholera.
 1881 – Louis Pasteur develops an anthrax vaccine.
 1882 – Louis Pasteur develops a rabies vaccine.
 1887 – Willem Einthoven invents electrocardiography (ECG/EKG) 
 1890 – Emil von Behring discovers antitoxins and uses them to develop tetanus and diphtheria vaccines.
 1895 – Wilhelm Conrad Röntgen discovers medical use of X-rays in medical imaging

1900–1999 
 1901 – Karl Landsteiner discovers the existence of different human blood types
 1901 – Alois Alzheimer identifies the first case of what becomes known as Alzheimer's disease
 1906 – Frederick Hopkins suggests the existence of vitamins and suggests that a lack of vitamins causes scurvy and rickets
 1907 – Paul Ehrlich develops a chemotherapeutic cure for sleeping sickness
 1907 – Henry Stanley Plummer develops the first structured patient record and clinical number (Mayo clinic)
 1908 – Victor Horsley and R. Clarke invents the stereotactic method
 1909 – First intrauterine device described by Richard Richter.
 1910 – Hans Christian Jacobaeus performs the first laparoscopy on humans
 1917 – Julius Wagner-Jauregg discovers the malarial fever shock therapy for general paresis of the insane
 1921 – Edward Mellanby discovers vitamin D and shows that its absence causes rickets
 1921 – Frederick Banting and Charles Best discover insulin – important for the treatment of diabetes
 1921 – Fidel Pagés pioneers epidural anesthesia
 1923 – First vaccine for diphtheria
 1924 – Hans Berger discovers human electroencephalography 
 1926 – First vaccine for pertussis
 1927 – First vaccine for tuberculosis
 1927 – First vaccine for tetanus
 1930 – First successful sex reassignment surgery performed on Lili Elbe in Dresden, Germany.
 1932 – Gerhard Domagk develops a chemotherapeutic cure for streptococcus
 1933 – Manfred Sakel discovers insulin shock therapy
 1935 – Ladislas J. Meduna discovers metrazol shock therapy
 1935 – First vaccine for yellow fever
 1936 – Egas Moniz discovers prefrontal lobotomy for treating mental diseases; Enrique Finochietto develops the now ubiquitous self-retaining thoracic retractor
 1938 – Ugo Cerletti and Lucio Bini discover electroconvulsive therapy
 1938 – Howard Florey and Ernst Chain investigate Penicillin and attempted to mass-produce it and tested it on the policeman Albert Alexander (police officer) who recovered but died due to a lack of Penicillin
 1943 – Willem J. Kolff builds the first dialysis machine
 1944 – Disposable catheter – David S. Sheridan
 1946 – Chemotherapy – Alfred G. Gilman and Louis S. Goodman
 1947 – Defibrillator – Claude Beck
 1948 – Acetaminophen – Julius Axelrod, Bernard Brodie
 1949 – First implant of intraocular lens, by Sir Harold Ridley
 1949 – Mechanical assistor for anesthesia – John Emerson
 1952 – Jonas Salk develops the first polio vaccine (available in 1955)
 1952 – Cloning – Robert Briggs and Thomas King
 1953 – First live birth from frozen sperm
 1953 – Heart-lung machine – John Heysham Gibbon
 1953 – Medical ultrasonography – Inge Edler
 1954 – Joseph Murray performs the first human kidney transplant (on identical twins)
 1954 – Ventouse – Tage Malmstrom
 1955 – Tetracycline – Lloyd Conover
 1956 – Metered-dose inhaler – 3M
 1957 – William Grey Walter invents the brain EEG topography (toposcope)
 1958 – Pacemaker – Rune Elmqvist
 1959 – In vitro fertilization – Min Chueh Chang
 1960 – Invention of cardiopulmonary resuscitation (CPR)
 1960 – First combined oral contraceptive approved by the FDA
 1902 – Hip replacement – John Charnley
 1962 – Beta blocker James W. Black
 1962 – Albert Sabin develops first oral polio vaccine
 1963 – Artificial heart – Paul Winchell
 1963 – Thomas Starzl performs the first human liver transplant
 1963 – James Hardy  performs the first human lung transplant
 1963 – Valium (diazepam) – Leo H. Sternbach
 1964 – First vaccine for measles
 1965 – Frank Pantridge installs the first portable defibrillator
 1965 – First commercial ultrasound
 1966 – C. Walton Lillehei performs the first human pancreas transplant
 1966 – Rubella Vaccine – Harry Martin Meyer and Paul D. Parkman
 1967 – First vaccine for mumps
 1967 – René Favaloro develops Coronary Bypass surgery
 1967 – Christiaan Barnard performs the first human heart transplant
 1968 – Powered prothesis – Samuel Alderson
 1968 – Controlled drug delivery – Alejandro Zaffaron
 1969 – Balloon catheter – Thomas Fogarty
 1969 – Cochlear implant – William House
 1970 – Cyclosporine, the first effective immunosuppressive drug is introduced in organ transplant practice
 1971 – MMR Vaccine - developed by Maurice Hilleman
 1971 – Genetically modified organisms – Ananda Chakrabart
 1971 – Magnetic resonance imaging – Raymond Vahan Damadian
 1971 – Computed tomography (CT or CAT Scan) – Godfrey Hounsfield
 1971 – Transdermal patches – Alejandro Zaffaroni
 1971 – Sir Godfrey Hounsfield invents the first commercial CT scanner
 1972 – Insulin pump Dean Kamen
 1973 – Laser eye surgery (LASIK) – Mani Lal Bhaumik
 1974 – Liposuction – Giorgio Fischer
 1976 – First commercial PET scanner
 1978 – First live birth from in vitro fertilisation (IVF)
 1978 – Last fatal case of smallpox
 1979 – Antiviral drugs – George Hitchings and Gertrude Elion
 1980 – Raymond Damadian builds first commercial MRI scanner
 1980 – Lithotripter – Dornier Research Group
 1980 – First vaccine for hepatitis B – Baruch Samuel Blumberg
 1980 – Cloning of interferons – Sidney Pestka
 1981 – Artificial skin – John F. Burke and Ioannis V Yannas
 1981 – Bruce Reitz performs the first human heart-lung combined transplant
 1982 – Human insulin – Eli Lilly
 1985 – Automated DNA sequencer – Leroy Hood and Lloyd Smith
 1985 – Polymerase chain reaction (PCR) – Kary Mullis
 1985 – Surgical robot – Yik San Kwoh
 1985 – DNA fingerprinting – Alec Jeffreys
 1985 – Capsule endoscopy – Tarun Mullick
 1986 – Fluoxetine HCl – Eli Lilly and Co
 1987 – commercially available Statins – Merck & Co.
 1987 – Tissue engineering – Joseph Vacanti & Robert Langer
 1988 – Intravascular stent – Julio Palmaz
 1988 – Laser cataract surgery – Patricia Bath
 1989 – Pre-implantation genetic diagnosis (PGD) – Alan Handyside
 1989 – DNA microarray – Stephen Fodor
 1990 – Gamow bag® – Igor Gamow
 1992 – First vaccine for hepatitis A available
 1992 – Electroactive polymers (artificial muscle) – SRI International
 1992 – Intracytoplasmic sperm injection (ICSI) – Andre van Steirteghem
 1995 – Adult stem cell use in regeneration of tissues and organs in vivo – B. G Matapurkar U.S . International Patent
 1996 – Dolly the Sheep cloned
 1998 – Stem cell therapy – James Thomson

2000–2022 

 2000 – The Human Genome Project draft was completed.
 2001 – The first telesurgery was performed by Jacques Marescaux.
 2003 – Carlo Urbani, of Doctors without Borders alerted the World Health Organization to the threat of the SARS virus, triggering the most effective response to an epidemic in history. Urbani succumbs to the disease himself in less than a month.
 2005 – Jean-Michel Dubernard performs the first partial face transplant.
 2006 – First HPV vaccine approved.
 2006 – The second rotavirus vaccine approved (first was withdrawn).
 2007 – The visual prosthetic (bionic eye) Argus II.
 2008 – Laurent Lantieri performs the first full face transplant.
 2011 – First successful Uterus transplant from a deceased donor in Turkey
 2013 – The first kidney was grown in vitro in the U.S.
 2013 – The first human liver was grown from stem cells in Japan.
 2014 – A 3D printer is used for first ever skull transplant.
 2016 – The first ever artificial pancreas was created
 2019 – 3D-print heart from human patient's cells.
 2020 – First vaccine for COVID-19.
 2022 – The complete human genome is sequenced.

See also 
 Timeline of antibiotics
 Timeline of vaccines
 Timeline of hospitals

Further reading
 1911 Encyclopædia Britannica, Volume 18, Medicine, Wikisource.

Notes 

Reference:
1.  International patent USA. .wef 1995. US PTO no.6227202 and 20020007223.
2.  R. Maingot's Text Book of Abdominal operations.1997 USA.
3.  Text book of Obstetrics and Gynecology. 2010 J P Publishers.

References 
Matapurkar B G. (1995). US international Patent 6227202 and 20020007223.medical use of Adult Stem cells. A new physiological phenomenon of Desired Metaplasia for regeneration of tissues and organs in vivo. Annals of NYAS 1998.
 Bynum,   W. F. and Roy Porter, eds. Companion Encyclopedia of the History of Medicine (2 vol. 1997); 1840pp; 72 long essays by scholars  excerpt and text search
 Conrad, Lawrence I. et al.  The Western Medical Tradition: 800 BC to AD 1800 (1995);  excerpt and text search
 Bynum, W.F. et al. The Western Medical Tradition: 1800-2000 (2006)  excerpt and text search
 Loudon, Irvine, ed. Western Medicine: An Illustrated History (1997) online 
 McGrew, Roderick. Encyclopedia of Medical History (1985)
 
 Porter, Roy, ed.  The Cambridge History of Medicine (2006); 416pp;  excerpt and text search
 Porter, Roy, ed.  The Cambridge Illustrated History of Medicine (2001)  excerpt and text search excerpt and text search
 Singer, Charles,  and E. Ashworth Underwood. A Short History of Medicine (2nd ed. 1962)
 Watts, Sheldon. Disease and Medicine in World History (2003), 166pp online

External links 
 Interactive timeline of medicine and medical technology (requires Flash plugin)
 The Historyscoper

 
History of medicine
Medical